Who You Selling For is the third studio album by American rock band The Pretty Reckless. It was released on October 21, 2016, by Razor & Tie. The album reached number 13 on the US Billboard 200 and number 23 on the UK Albums Chart. Its lead single, "Take Me Down", topped the Billboard US Mainstream Rock chart in October 2016. The album also spawned the singles "Oh My God" and "Back to the River".

Background and release
In early September 2015, frontwoman Taylor Momsen confirmed that the band was working on new material in the studio. Momsen co-wrote all the songs with lead guitarist Ben Phillips, while the album was produced by longtime collaborator Kato Khandwala. Writing for the album began shortly after the completion of two years of touring in support of the band's second studio album, Going to Hell (2014). "We had so much we wanted to say, it was like shaking a can of soda on tour, and then when we started writing we cracked the seal", Momsen said. "The touring life is very isolating. You look at the world through a bus or airplane window. But music is the healing factor. It's the one thing that is grounding and a true companion through the forest. It saved us—again."

The album's title, Who You Selling For, and its release date were officially announced on August 9, 2016. Regarding the title, Momsen said, "For me, it's a question that challenges what I'm doing with my life. It questions the meaning of my actions whatever they are. It also defines the record in a grander way by asking the listener to look into the meaning of each song past the obvious." She also explained that the cover art is "a very direct representation of how I feel at the moment. I wanted it to be artistic and emote how I'm feeling at this junction in my life. An artist came to me with this image, and it was just perfect! The artist is a close friend who wants to remain anonymous, but they had heard the record and worked based off of  the music to create that image."

The lead single from Who You Selling For, "Take Me Down", was released digitally on July 15, 2016, and was serviced to US active rock radio on July 19. When the single topped Billboards Mainstream Rock chart on the issue dated November 5, 2016, The Pretty Reckless became the first act to send its first four entries to number one on that chart, as well as the female-fronted group with the most number ones. "Oh My God" was released on September 9, 2016, as the album's second single. In support of the album, the band has embarked on the Who You Selling For Tour across the United States, which kicked off on October 20, 2016, in Tulsa, Oklahoma. A third single, "Back to the River", was sent to US active rock radio on June 13, 2017.

Critical reception

Stephen Thomas Erlewine of AllMusic opined that the band "have decided to grow up on Who You Selling For and, thanks to their inherent muscle and the sharp articulation of producer Kato Khandwala, this self-conscious maturation succeeds." Chad Bowar of Loudwire wrote that the album "continues the maturation of [the band's] sound, delivering a varied batch of memorable songs", concluding, "With too many hard rock bands sounding sterile and calculated, it makes the rawness, emotion and originality of Who You Selling For stand out even more." Emma Matthews of Rock Sound commented that "The Pretty Reckless may have evolved over the years, but one trait that remains is frontwoman Taylor Momsen's fearlessness in the face of change."

Commercial performance
Who You Selling For debuted at number 13 on the US Billboard 200 with 19,580 copies sold in pure album sales. The album debuted at number 23 on the UK Albums Chart, selling 4,157 copies in its first week.

Track listing

Personnel
Credits adapted from the liner notes of Who You Selling For.

The Pretty Reckless
 Taylor Momsen
 Ben Phillips
 Jamie Perkins
 Mark Damon

Additional personnel

 Kato Khandwala – production, recording, mixing
 Sean "Gingineer" Kelly – additional engineering
 Ted Jensen – mastering
 Christian Pelaez – recording assistance
 Noel Herbolario – recording assistance
 Josh Gomersall – recording assistance
 Jay Colangelo – drum teching
 Demon Drums – drum teching
 JD Findley – guitar teching
 Ryan Smith – vinyl cut
 Warren Haynes – lead guitar 
 Andy Burton – keyboards, organ, piano
 Tommy Byrnes – guitar 
 Janice Pendarvis – background vocals 
 Jenny Douglas-Foote – background vocals 
 Sophia Ramos – background vocals 
 Adam Larson – art direction

Charts

Weekly charts

Year-end charts

References

2016 albums
The Pretty Reckless albums
Razor & Tie albums